Izabela Textorisová (16 March 1866, in Ratková – 12 September 1949, in Krupina) was Slovakia's first female botanist. Her copious herbarium is still today a valuable source for botanists. She described more than a hundred new plants in the Turiec region. In 1893 she discovered a new species of thistle, later named Carduus textorisianus Marg. in her honor.  

A main-belt asteroid discovered in 2000 was also named in her honor.

See also
Timeline of women in science

References

1866 births
1949 deaths
Slovak women scientists
Slovak botanists
Women botanists
19th-century botanists
19th-century women scientists
Czechoslovak botanists
20th-century women scientists
People from Revúca District
Burials at National Cemetery in Martin